Lake Arenal is a lake which is situated in the northern highlands of Costa Rica. Its depth varies between 30 and 60 meters (100–200 feet) seasonally.

The town of Arenal was relocated to higher ground when the lake was expanded in 1979. The old towns of Arenal and Tronadora now lie abandoned at the bottom of the lake, with the new town of Arenal existing to the northeast on the lake.

Hydroelectricity 
Lake Arenal was tripled in size with the construction of the Arenal dam in 1979, which exists at the eastern end of the lake. This hydroelectric project exists at the western end of the lake and is strategically important to Costa Rica, initially generating 70% of the country's electricity, now closer to 17%, and was also a driving force behind Costa Rica's green energy policy.

Wildlife 
Fish species in Lake Arenal include the machaca and the rainbow bass. There are also many species of plants, 120 mammals (including jaguar and tapir), and 300 birds (including quetzal).

Recreation 
From November through April the strong, dependable winds attract windsurfers and kite surfers to its western end. Many consider Lake Arenal one of the world's foremost windsurfing and kite surfing areas. Wakeboarding is gaining popularity in Costa Rica, with Lake Arenal being the center of this activity. Stand up paddling and kayaking are also popular activities for tourists visiting the lake's Eastern part near the earthen dam.  There is much good fishing (primarily for rainbow bass) and now kayak fishing opportunities in the shallow and secluded coves. The area surrounding the lake has good hiking, biking, bird watching, and horseback riding opportunities.

Gallery

References

External links 
 Lake Arenal information
 Lake Arenal information about wind and water
 Lake Arenal information about rainforest, mountains and lake
 Lake Arenal information about transportation

 
Geography of Alajuela Province
Geography of Guanacaste Province
Arenal
Ramsar sites in Costa Rica
Arenal
Tourist attractions in Alajuela Province
Tourist attractions in Guanacaste Province